William F. Taylor may refer to:

W. F. Taylor (1877–1945), Canadian ice hockey administrator
William Frederick Taylor (1840–1927), medical doctor and member of the Queensland Legislative Council
William F. Taylor (artist), American artist
William F. Taylor (colonel), American colonel in the Confederate States of America
William F. Taylor (politician), American politician